Jerome Gantt (born October 20, 1948) is a retired National Football League (NFL) and Canadian Football League (CFL) offensive tackle and Grey Cup champion.

Gantt played college football at North Carolina Central University and was chosen in the fourth round (80th overall) of the 1970 NFL Draft by the NFL's Buffalo Bills, where he played 6 games as a back-up. In 1972, he moved to Canada with the Hamilton Tiger-Cats and won the Grey Cup with them that year. In 1974, he played for the Saskatchewan Roughriders. He also joined the Montreal Alouettes of the CFL and was part of their 1974 Grey Cup winning team. He finished his career in 1975 with the Charlotte Hornets of the World Football League.

References

External links
 
CFLapedia Bio
Pro-Football Reference Bio

1948 births
Sportspeople from Greensboro, North Carolina
Players of American football from Greensboro, North Carolina
Buffalo Bills players
Montreal Alouettes players
Hamilton Tiger-Cats players
Saskatchewan Roughriders players
Charlotte Hornets (WFL) players
North Carolina Central Eagles football players
African-American players of Canadian football
Living people
21st-century African-American people
20th-century African-American sportspeople
American football offensive tackles
Canadian football offensive linemen